The Egypt men's national sitting volleyball team represents Egypt in international sitting volleyball competitions and friendly matches. The team is one of the newcomers in the sport. Egypt have appeared in several Paralympic and World Championships semi finals.

Players

Egypt roster in 2016:

 1 (S) ELSHWIKH Hesham (C) - Outside Hitter
 3 KHATER Shaaban - Outside Hitter
 4 (S) ABDALLA Ashraf - Opposite Spiker
 5 ZEID Mohamed - Setter
 6 (S) SOLIMAN Ahmed - Middle Block
 7 AMER Ahmed - Outside Hitter
 8 MASSOUD Hossam - Setter
 9 (S) MOUSSA Elsayed - Outside Hitter
 10 (S) ABDELLATIF Abdelnaby - Libero
 11 EID Sabry - Outside Hitter
 12 (S) ABOUELYAZEID Mohamed - Middle Block
 14 (S) ABOUELKHIR Metawa - Outside Hitter

Honours

Paralympic Games

World Championships

Minor Tournaments

 Sarajevo Open Championship:

 Runners-Up (1): 2006
 4th place (1): 2016

World ranking
As at 28 September 2016.

Coaching staff

See also

 Egypt at the Paralympics
 Volleyball at the Summer Paralympics
 World Organization Volleyball for Disabled

References

Volleyball in Egypt
V
National sitting volleyball teams